The Innocent Cheat is a 1921 American silent drama film directed by Ben F. Wilson and starring Roy Stewart, Sidney De Gray and Rhea Mitchell.

Cast
 Roy Stewart as John Murdock
 Sidney De Gray as Bruce Stanhope
 George Hernandez as Tim Reilly
 Rhea Mitchell as Peggy Adair
 Kathleen Kirkham as Mary Stanhope

References

Bibliography
 Munden, Kenneth White. The American Film Institute Catalog of Motion Pictures Produced in the United States, Part 1. University of California Press, 1997.

External links
 

1921 films
1921 drama films
1920s English-language films
American silent feature films
Silent American drama films
Films directed by Ben F. Wilson
Arrow Film Corporation films
1920s American films